Wyoming Highway 137 (WYO 137) was a  east–west Wyoming State Road in central Fremont County.

Route description
Wyoming Highway 137 began its western end at 17 mile Road, east of Ethete, and northwest of Arapahoe, a census-designated place (CDP). 17 Mile Road continues west from here to Wyoming Highway 132 near Ethete. Highway 137 traveled eastward and intersected the northern terminus of Wyoming Highway 138 in the unincorporated community of St. Stephens at just over five miles. WYO 137 turned east-northeast for the remainder of its route and ended 3 miles later at Wyoming Highway 789 south of Riverton. The entire route was located within the Wind River Indian Reservation.

History
Upon completion of various roadway improvement projects along the route circa 2013, the Wyoming Department of Transportation turned control of WYO 137 over to tribal control by 2015. The road remains open to the public, with maintenance and law enforcement duties residing with the Northern Arapaho and Eastern Shoshone tribes.

Major intersections

References

External links 

Wyoming State Routes 100-199
WYO 137 - WYO 138 to 17 Mile Road
WYO 137 - WYO 789 to WYO 138

Transportation in Fremont County, Wyoming
137
Wind River Indian Reservation